José Antonio Plana (born April 19, 1952) is a Cuban actor and director. He is known for playing Betty Suarez's father, Ignacio Suarez, on the ABC television show Ugly Betty and for voicing Manuel "Manny" Calavera in the video game Grim Fandango.

Early life and education
Plana was born in Havana, Cuba. His family moved to Miami in 1960. He is a graduate of Loyola Marymount University and was trained in acting at the Royal Academy of Dramatic Art in London, UK.

Career
While known to a broad audience for his roles in feature films and television, Plana is also known for his skills in acting and directing for the stage. He has created and directed a number of Shakespeare productions for minority audiences and has been active in the Los Angeles, Washington, D.C. and New York City theater communities, including leading appearances on Broadway and at New York City's Public Theater. He originated the role of Rudy in the L.A. production of Luis Valdez's play Zoot Suit, going on to play Rudy in the film version.

Plana has acted, directed and written for television in series, miniseries, and specials such as Hill Street Blues, Star Trek: Deep Space Nine, Resurrection Boulevard, Commander in Chief, CSI: Crime Scene Investigation, The West Wing, 24, and Cagney & Lacey.

Plana has acted in films such as An Officer and a Gentleman, Three Amigos, Goal!, and Lone Star. He is known to PC gamers as the voice of Manny Calavera in the LucasArts 1998 adventure game Grim Fandango. In 2011, Plana guest starred in Desperate Housewives as Gabrielle Solis's abusive stepfather, Alejandro Perez. He also directed Witch's Lament, a Desperate Housewives episode in the show's eighth season. In 2011, he appeared in Body of Proof, in the episode "Helping Hand".

Plana participated in the web series Los Americans (2011), about a middle-class family in Los Angeles.

Plana teaches acting at California State University, Dominguez Hills and Rio Hondo College. In 2012, he served as an official judge for the Noor Iranian Film Festival.

Politics
Plana volunteers as a spokesperson for comprehensive immigration reform. He was the keynote speaker for the 2012 LULAC conference in Coronado Springs Convention Center in Lake Buena Vista, Florida.

Awards
Won
 Satellite Awards for Best Actor in a Supporting Role in a Series, Miniseries, or Motion Picture Made for Television for his role as "Ignacio Suarez," Ugly Betty, on December 17, 2006.

Nominations
 Screen Actors Guild Awards: Screen Actors Guild Award for Best Ensemble - Comedy Series for: Ugly Betty (2006).
 ALMA Awards: Outstanding Actor in a Television Series for: Resurrection Blvd. (2002)
 ALMA Awards: Outstanding Actor in a New Television Series for: Resurrection Blvd. (2001)
 Bravo Awards: Outstanding Actor in a Feature Film for: Lone Star (1996).

Selected filmography

 1978 What's Happening!! (TV Series) as Amid
 1978 The Boss' Son as Juan
 1978 The Paper Chase (TV Series) as Marcos
 1980 Seed of Innocence (uncredited)
 1980 First Family as White House Gardener
 1981 Madame X (TV Movie) as Senor Rueda
 1981 Love & Money as National Guard General
 1981 Zoot Suit as Rudy
 1981 Circle of Power as Reza Haddad
 1982 An Officer and a Gentleman as Emiliano De la Serra
 1983 Valley Girl as Low Rider
 1983 Nightmares as Father Luis Del Amo (segment "The Benediction")
 1983 El Norte as Carlos, The Bus Boy
 1983 Deal of the Century as Chicano Man
 1983 What's Up, Hideous Sun Demon as Officer Ignatz
 1985 City Limits as Ramos
 1985 Latino as Ruben
 1986 The Best of Times as Chico
 1986 Salvador as Major Max
 1986 Three Amigos as 'Jefe'
 1987 Disorderlies as Miguel
 1987 Born in East L.A. as Feo
 1984-1988 Miami Vice (TV Series) as Ernesto Guerrero / Cinco
 1988 Buy & Cell as Raoul
 1988 Break of Dawn (TV Movie) as Rodriguez
 1989 The Case of the Hillside Stranglers (TV Movie) as Mike Hernandez
 1989 Romero as Father Manuel Morantes
 1990 Why Me? as Benjy Klopzik
 1990 The Rookie (1990) as Morales
 1990 Havana as Julio Ramos
 1991 Seinfeld (Season 2 Episode 5: "The Apartment") as Manny
 1991 One Good Cop as Beniamino Rios
 1991 The Golden Girls (TV Series) as Alvarez
 1991 JFK as Carlos Bringuier
 1992 Live Wire as Al-Red
 1993 Red Hot as KGB Investigator
 1993 Greshnitsa v maske as Le Arden
 1994 A Million to Juan as Jorge
 1995 Silver Strand (TV Movie) as Richie Guttierez
 1995 Nixon as Manolo Sanchez
 1996 Primal Fear as Martinez
 1996 Lone Star as Ray
 1996 The Disappearance of Garcia Lorca as Marcos, Lorca's Friend
 1996 Canción desesperada as Patrick
 1997 Down for the Barrio as Cesar
 1997 Santa Fe as Chief Gomez
 1997 One Eight Seven as Principal Garcia
 1998 The Wonderful Ice Cream Suit as Victor Medina
 1998 Shadow of Doubt as Detective Krause
 1999 Let the Devil Wear Black as Tall
 1999 Every Dog Has Its Day as The Cop
 2000 Knockout as Chuck Alvarado
 2000 Picking Up the Pieces as Usher
 2001 Vegas, City of Dreams as Captain Martin
 2002 Half Past Dead as Warden Juan Ruiz 'El Fuego' Escarzaga
 2003 John Doe (Season 1, Episode 17: "Doe or Die") as Captain Ruiz
 2003 Monk (TV Series) as Captain Alameda
 2004 24 (TV Series) as Omar
 2005 The Lost City as The Emcee
 2005 Goal! as Hernan Munez
 2005 The Closer as Alonzo Lopez
 2006-2010 Ugly Betty(TV Series) as Ignacio Suarez
 2007 El Muerto as Aparicio
 2007 Hacia la oscuridad as Carlos Gutierrez
 2007 Half Past Dead 2 as Warden Juan Ruiz 'El Fuego' Escarzaga
 2008 AmericanEast as Dez
 2009 Life Is Hot in Cracktown as Lou
 2011 Desperate Housewives (TV Series) as Alejandro Perez
 2011 Body of Proof (Episode 3: "Helping Hand") as Armando Rosas
 2011 America as Tio Poldo
 2012 The Man Who Shook the Hand of Vicente Fernandez as Dr. Dominguez
 2013 Psych (Season 7, Episode 4: "No Country for Two Old Men") as Pablo Nuñez
 2013 Pain and Gain as Captain Lopez
 2013 Jodi Arias: Dirty Little Secret as Prosecutor Juan Martinez
 2013-2014 Alpha House (TV Series) as Benito 'Benny' Lopez
 2013 A Miracle in Spanish Harlem as Mariano
 2014 Jane the Virgin (TV Series) as Father Ortega
 2015-2017 The Fosters (TV Series) as Victor Gutierrez
 2015 Cristela (TV Series) as Joaquin Alvarez
 2015 Criminal Minds: Beyond Borders (TV Series) as Father Consolmango
 2016 The Young Pope (TV Series) as Carlos García
 2016 America Adrift as William Fernandez
 2016-2018 Lethal Weapon (TV Series) as Ronnie Delgado
 2017-2020 Superstore as Ron Sosa
 2017 Roman J. Israel, Esq. as Jessie Salinas
 2017 Butterfly Caught as Michael Channis
 2017-2019 One Day at a Time (TV Series) as Berto
 2017-2018 Colony as Proxy Alcala
 2017-2019 The Punisher (TV Series) as Rafael Hernandez
 2018 Mayans M.C. (7 episodes) as Devante Cano
 2018 Shooter (1 episode) as Guitierez
 2019 Dynasty as  Cristal Jennings’ father, Silvio Flores.
 2019 Elena of Avalor (1 episode) as Qapa 
 2019 Wasp Network as Luis Posada Carriles
 2020 Connecting... (TV series) as Ramon

Voice acting
 Godzilla 1985 (1985) as Goro Maki (voice, uncredited)
 Santo Bugito (1995, TV Series) as Paco
 Extreme Ghostbusters (1997, TV Series) (voice)
 Grim Fandango (1998, Video Game) as Manuel "Manny" Calavera
 Cuba Libre (2003) as Narrator (voice)
 Hiroshima - Radio play based on the book by John Hersey, adapted by John Valentine (2003)
 Ghost Recon Wildlands(2017,Video Game) as El Cardenal
 Elena of Avalor (2018, TV Series) as Oapa (voice)
 The Legend of Vox Machina (2023, TV Series) as Kamaljiori (voice)

References

External links

1952 births
Living people
Alumni of RADA
American male video game actors
Cuban male film actors
Cuban male television actors
Cuban male voice actors
Cuban emigrants to the United States
Loyola Marymount University alumni
Hispanic and Latino American male actors
20th-century American male actors
21st-century American male actors